Kurshaki (Körşäk) is a rural locality (a village) in Chuvash-Kubovsky Selsoviet, Iglinsky District, Bashkortostan, Russia. The population was 219 as of 2010. There are 3 streets.

Geography 
Kurshaki is located 13 km northeast of Iglino (the district's administrative centre) by road. Chuvash-Kubovo is the nearest rural locality.

References 

Rural localities in Iglinsky District